The $64 Tomato: How One Man Nearly Lost His Sanity, Spent a Fortune, and Endured an Existential Crisis in the Quest for the Perfect Garden is a nonfiction book by William Alexander, published in 2006. The $64 Tomato was a nominee for Quill Award in the debut author of the year category and was selected for the 2006 National Book Festival.

Summary 
The $64 Tomato is a memoir of Alexander's gardening project. When he and his family purchased a home with several acres in a small town in New York, he was determined to use some of the property to create a  organic garden. Alexander documents his adventures battling pests, weeds, plant diseases, deer, and a persistent groundhog he names Superchuck. After several years of gardening, he computes that each Brandywine tomato he grew and harvested cost him $64.

Author 
William Alexander is the director of technology at the Nathan S. Kline Institute for Psychiatric Research in Orangeburg, New York. He graduated from the University at Albany with a degree in English literature. He is married to Dr. Anne Mullin, an internist, and they have two children.

In addition to The $64 Tomato, Alexander has written op-eds for The New York Times. His other books are 52 Loaves: A Half-Baked Adventure and Flirting with French: How a Language Charmed Me, Seduced Me & Nearly Broke My Heart.

Reception 
Kirkus Reviews describes it as "An amusing compilation of do’s and don’ts for aspiring gardeners afflicted with hubris." Publishers Weekly says "this hilarious horticultural memoir...manages to impart an existential lesson on the interconnectedness of nature and the fine line between nurturing and killing."

Constance Casey, writing in The New York Times Book Review, says Alexander's "writing is engaging, well paced and informative". In The New York Times Magazine, Holly Brubach recommends The $64 Tomato to prevent "Obsessive Gardening Syndrome" and says Alexander's "timing and his delivery are flawless". Anthony Doerr, in The Boston Globe, calls the book a "quick and very entertaining summer read".

Additional reviews
The Star-Democrat (Easton, Maryland)
Charlotte Observer
The News and Observer (Raleigh, North Carolina)
The Honolulu Advertiser
Rutland Daily Herald (Vermont)
Library Journal
School Library Journal
The Booklist
The Christian Century
The Washington Post

References

External links 
NPR interview and book excerpt
New York Times interview

2006 non-fiction books
Algonquin Books books